Lazarus Ledd is an Italian comic book, first published in Italy in 1993 by Edizioni Star Comics.

Authors who worked to the Lazarus Ledd include writers Ade Capone, Stefano Vietti, Marcello Toninelli and drawers Emanuelo Barison, Alberto Gennari, Giancarlo Olivares and Stefano Raffaele.

1993 comics debuts
Italian comics titles